Saint Mary Lake is the second-largest lake in Glacier National Park, in the U.S. state of Montana.

Located on the east side of the park, Going-to-the-Sun Road parallels the lake along its north shore. Here, the great plains end and the Rocky Mountains begin in an abrupt  elevation change, with Little Chief Mountain posing a formidable southern flank above the west end of the lake.

The waters of the lake rarely rise above  and are home to various species of trout.

The opening scene in the 1980 Stanley Kubrick film The Shining was shot at Saint Mary Lake.

Wild Goose Island rises a mere 14 feet (4.3 m) above the lake. The island is dwarfed by the lake and surrounding mountains, yet it is of one of the most frequently photographed locations along the Going-to-the-Sun Road.

Gallery

See also
List of lakes in Glacier County, Montana

References

Going-to-the-Sun Road
Lakes of Glacier National Park (U.S.)
Lakes of Glacier County, Montana